Bannari Amman Group is an industrial conglomerate based in Tamil Nadu, with presence in manufacturing, trading and service. Manufacturing and trading activities include sugar, alcohol, liquor, granite etc. The service sector has wind power energy, education etc. It was founded by S. V. Balasubramaniam who is the Chairman of the group.

History 
In the beginning - 1980s - BAG mainly was a sugar manufacturer. The by-product of the sugar production - Molasses - was used for their distilleries. This solution gave BAG the possibility to produce alcohol at low-cost and expand their production due to the high profit margin and the growing alcohol market in Southindia.

Companies
 Bannari Amman Sugars Limited
 Shiva Cargo Movers Limited
 Bannari  Rural Foundation
 Shiva Distilleries Limited

Education 

Bannari Amman Institute of Technology
 Bannari Amman Public School
 Bannari Amman  Vidya Niketan Matriculation Higher Secondary School

Bannari Amman Group Companies  Details

Bannari Amman Sugars Limited 

 The First Sugar Unit near Sathyamangalam of Erode District, Tamil Nadu State, started its commercial production in the year 1986. 
 The Second Sugar Unit near Nanjangud in Mysore District of Karnataka State, started the commercial production in the year 1992 with a Co-Generation Plant.
 The Third Sugar Unit near  Kunthur , Kollegal, Chamrajnagar District, Karnataka .
 The Fourth Sugar Unit With Co-generation Plant at Kolundampattu Village, Thandarampattu Taluk, Tiruvannamalai District in the year 2010.
 The Fifth Sugar Unit with Co-generation Plant at Vengur Village, Tirukoilur Taluk, Villuppuram District.

Shiva Cargo Movers Limited 

 The business of transporting liquid cargo, molasses and alcohol under Shiva Cargo Movers Limited started from 1985.

Shiva Distilleries Limited 

Shiva Distilleries Private Limited, established in the year 1983 at Coimbatore, Tamil Nadu, India, is engaged in the production of wide range of Indian Made Foreign Liquor.

References

 
 
 
 
 
 
 
 

Conglomerate companies of India
Sugar companies of India
Companies based in Tamil Nadu
Companies listed on the Bombay Stock Exchange
Companies based in Coimbatore
1980s establishments in Tamil Nadu
Conglomerate companies established in the 20th century